Karst is a topography formed from the dissolution of soluble rocks such as limestone, dolomite, and gypsum. It is characterized by underground drainage systems with sinkholes and caves. It has also been documented for more weathering-resistant rocks, such as quartzite, given the right conditions. Subterranean drainage may limit surface water, with few to no rivers or lakes. However, in regions where the dissolved bedrock is covered (perhaps by debris) or confined by one or more superimposed non-soluble rock strata, distinctive karst features may occur only at subsurface levels and can be totally missing above ground.

The study of paleokarst (buried karst in the stratigraphic column) is important in petroleum geology because as much as 50% of the world's hydrocarbon reserves are hosted in carbonate rock, and much of this is found in porous karst systems.

Etymology

The English word karst was borrowed from German  in the late 19th century, which entered German much earlier. According to one interpretation, the term is derived from the German name for a number of geological, geomorphological, and hydrological features found within the range of the Dinaric Alps. The range stretches from the northeastern corner of Italy above the city of Trieste, across the Balkan peninsula along the coast of the eastern Adriatic to Kosovo and North Macedonia, where the massif of the Šar Mountains begins. The karst zone is at the northwesternmost section, described in early topographical research as a plateau between Italy and Slovenia.

The Slovene common noun  was first attested in the 18th century, and the adjective form  in the 16th century. As a proper noun, the Slovene form  was first attested in 1177.

Ultimately, the word is of Mediterranean origin. It has been suggested that the word may derive from the Proto-Indo-European root  'rock'. The name may also be connected to the oronym Kar(u)sádios oros cited by Ptolemy, and perhaps also to Latin .

Early studies

Johann Weikhard von Valvasor, a pioneer of the study of karst in Slovenia and a fellow of the Royal Society for Improving Natural Knowledge, London, introduced the word karst to European scholars in 1689, describing the phenomenon of underground flows of rivers in his account of Lake Cerknica.

Jovan Cvijić greatly advanced the knowledge of karst regions, so much that he became known as the "father of karst geomorphology". Primarily discussing the karstic regions of the Balkans, Cvijić's 1893 publication Das Karstphänomen describes landforms such as karren, dolines and poljes. In a 1918 publication, Cvijić proposed a cyclical model for karstic landscape development. Karst hydrology emerged as a discipline in the late 1950s and early 1960s in France. Previously, the activities of cave explorers, called speleologists, had been dismissed as more of a sport than a science, meaning that underground karstic caves and their associated watercourses were, from a scientific perspective, understudied.

Development

Karst is most strongly developed in dense carbonate rock, such as limestone, that is thinly bedded and highly fractured. Karst is not typically well developed in chalk, because chalk is highly porous rather than dense, so the flow of groundwater is not concentrated along fractures. Karst is also most strongly developed where the water table is relatively low, such as in uplands with entrenched valleys, and where rainfall is moderate to heavy. This contributes to rapid downward movement of groundwater, which promotes dissolution of the bedrock, whereas standing groundwater becomes saturated with carbonate minerals and ceases to dissolve the bedrock.

Chemistry of dissolution
The carbonic acid that causes karstic features is formed as rain passes through Earth's atmosphere picking up carbon dioxide (CO2), which readily dissolves in the water. Once the rain reaches the ground, it may pass through soil that provides additional CO2 produced by soil respiration. Some of the dissolved carbon dioxide reacts with the water to form a weak carbonic acid solution, which dissolves calcium carbonate. The primary reaction sequence in limestone dissolution is the following:

In very rare conditions, oxidation can play a role. Oxidation played a major role in the formation of ancient Lechuguilla Cave in the US state of New Mexico and is presently active in the Frasassi Caves of Italy. The oxidation of sulfides leading to the formation of sulfuric acid can also be one of the corrosion factors in karst formation. As oxygen (O2)-rich surface waters seep into deep anoxic karst systems, they bring oxygen, which reacts with sulfide present in the system (pyrite or hydrogen sulfide) to form sulfuric acid (H2SO4). Sulfuric acid then reacts with calcium carbonate, causing increased erosion within the limestone formation. This chain of reactions is:

This reaction chain forms gypsum.

Morphology

The karstification of a landscape may result in a variety of large- or small-scale features both on the surface and beneath. On exposed surfaces, small features may include solution flutes (or rillenkarren), runnels, limestone pavement (clints and grikes), kamenitzas collectively called karren or lapiez. Medium-sized surface features may include sinkholes or cenotes (closed basins), vertical shafts, foibe (inverted funnel shaped sinkholes), disappearing streams, and reappearing springs. Large-scale features may include limestone pavements, poljes, and karst valleys. Mature karst landscapes, where more bedrock has been removed than remains, may result in karst towers, or haystack/eggbox landscapes. Beneath the surface, complex underground drainage systems (such as karst aquifers) and extensive caves and cavern systems may form.

Erosion along limestone shores, notably in the tropics, produces karst topography that includes a sharp makatea surface above the normal reach of the sea, and undercuts that are mostly the result of biological activity or bioerosion at or a little above mean sea level. Some of the most dramatic of these formations can be seen in Thailand's Phangnga Bay and at Halong Bay in Vietnam.

Calcium carbonate dissolved into water may precipitate out where the water discharges some of its dissolved carbon dioxide. Rivers which emerge from springs may produce tufa terraces, consisting of layers of calcite deposited over extended periods of time. In caves, a variety of features collectively called speleothems are formed by deposition of calcium carbonate and other dissolved minerals.

Hydrology

Farming in karst areas must take into account the lack of surface water. The soils may be fertile enough, and rainfall may be adequate, but rainwater quickly moves through the crevices into the ground, sometimes leaving the surface soil parched between rains.

A karst fenster (karst window) occurs when an underground stream emerges onto the surface between layers of rock, cascades some distance, and then disappears back down, often into a sinkhole. Rivers in karst areas may disappear underground a number of times and spring up again in different places, usually under a different name (like Ljubljanica, the river of seven names). An example of this is the Popo Agie River in Fremont County, Wyoming. At a site simply named "The Sinks" in Sinks Canyon State Park, the river flows into a cave in a formation known as the Madison Limestone and then rises again  down the canyon in a placid pool. A turlough is a unique type of seasonal lake found in Irish karst areas which are formed through the annual welling-up of water from the underground water system.Water supplies from wells in karst topography may be unsafe, as the water may have run unimpeded from a sinkhole in a cattle pasture, through a cave and to the well, bypassing the normal filtering that occurs in a porous aquifer. Karst formations are cavernous and therefore have high rates of permeability, resulting in reduced opportunity for contaminants to be filtered. Groundwater in karst areas is just as easily polluted as surface streams. Sinkholes have often been used as farmstead or community trash dumps. Overloaded or malfunctioning septic tanks in karst landscapes may dump raw sewage directly into underground channels. Geologists are concerned with these negative effects of human activity on karst hydrology which, supplied about 25% of the global demand for drinkable water.

The karst topography also poses difficulties for human inhabitants. Sinkholes can develop gradually as surface openings enlarge, but progressive erosion is frequently unseen until the roof of a cavern suddenly collapses. Such events have swallowed homes, cattle, cars, and farm machinery. In the United States, sudden collapse of such a cavern-sinkhole swallowed part of the collection of the National Corvette Museum in Bowling Green, Kentucky in 2014.

Interstratal karst
Interstratal karst is a karstic landscape which is developed beneath a cover of insoluble rocks. Typically this will involve a cover of sandstone overlying limestone strata undergoing solution. In the United Kingdom for example extensive doline fields have developed at Cefn yr Ystrad, Mynydd Llangatwg and Mynydd Llangynidr in South Wales across a cover of Twrch Sandstone which overlies concealed Carboniferous Limestone, the last-named having been declared a site of special scientific interest in respect of it.

Kegelkarst 
Kegelkarst is a type of tropical karst terrain with numerous cone-like hills, formed by cockpits, mogotes, and poljes and without strong fluvial erosion processes. This terrain is found in Cuba, Jamaica, Indonesia, Malaysia, the Philippines, Puerto Rico, southern China, Myanmar, Thailand, Laos and Vietnam.

Pseudokarst
Pseudokarsts are similar in form or appearance to karst features but are created by different mechanisms. Examples include lava caves and granite tors—for example, Labertouche Cave in Victoria, Australia—and paleocollapse features. Mud Caves are an example of pseudokarst.

Salt karst
Salt karst (or 'halite karst') is developed in areas where salt is undergoing solution underground. It can lead to surface depressions and collapses which present a geo-hazard.

Paleokarst
Paleokarst or palaeokarst is a development of karst observed in geological history and preserved within the rock sequence, effectively a fossil karst. There are for example palaeokarstic surfaces exposed within the Clydach Valley Subgroup of the Carboniferous Limestone sequence of South Wales which developed as sub-aerial weathering of recently formed limestones took place during periods of non-deposition within the early part of the period. Sedimentation resumed and further limestone strata were deposited on an irregular karstic surface, the cycle recurring several times in connection with fluctuating sea levels over prolonged periods.

Karst forest
Karst areas tend to have unique types of forests. The karst terrain is difficult for humans to traverse, so that their ecosystems are often relatively undisturbed. The soil tends to have a high pH, which encourages growth of unusual species of orchids, palms, mangroves, and other plants.

Karst areas

The world's largest limestone karst is Australia's Nullarbor Plain. Slovenia has the world's highest risk of sinkholes, while the western Highland Rim in the eastern United States is at the second-highest risk of karst sinkholes.

In Canada, Wood Buffalo National Park, NWT contains areas of karst sinkholes.

Mexico hosts important karstic regions in the Yucatán Peninsula and Chiapas.

The South China Karst in the provinces of Guizhou, Guangxi, and Yunnan provinces is a UNESCO World Heritage Site.

List of terms for karst-related features

 Abîme, a vertical shaft in karst that may be very deep and usually opens into a network of subterranean passages
 Cenote, a deep sinkhole, characteristic of Mexico, resulting from collapse of limestone bedrock that exposes groundwater underneath
 Doline, also sink or sinkhole, is a closed depression draining underground in karst areas. The name "doline" comes from dolina, meaning "valley", and derives from South Slavic languages.
 Foibe, an inverted funnel-shaped sinkhole
 Karst window (also known as a "karst fenster"), a feature where a spring emerges briefly, with the water discharge then abruptly disappearing into a nearby sinkhole
 Karst spring, a spring emerging from karst, originating a flow of water on the surface
 Limestone pavement, a landform consisting of a flat, incised surface of exposed limestone that resembles an artificial pavement
 Losing stream, sinking river or ponornica in South Slavic languages.
 Polje (karst polje, karst field), a large flat specifically karstic plain. The name "polje" derives from South Slavic languages.
 Ponor, same as estavelle, sink or sinkhole in South Slavic languages, where surface flow enters an underground system
 Scowle, porous irregular karstic landscape in a region of England.
 Turlough (turlach), a type of disappearing lake characteristic of Irish karst.
 Uvala, a collection of multiple smaller individual sinkholes that coalesce into a compound sinkhole. The term derives from South Slavic languages (many karst-related terms derive from South Slavic languages, entering scientific vocabulary through early research in the Western Balkan Dinaric Alpine karst).

See also

References

Further reading 
Ford, D.C., Williams, P., Karst Hydrogeology and Geomorphology, John Wiley and Sons Ltd., 2007, 
Jennings, J.N., Karst Geomorphology, 2nd ed., Blackwell, 1985, 
Palmer, A.N., Cave Geology, 2nd Printing, Cave Books, 2009, 
Sweeting, M.M., Karst Landforms, Macmillan, 1973, 
van Beynen, P. (Ed.), Karst management, Springer, 2011,  
Vermeulen, J.J., Whitten, T., "Biodiversity and Cultural Property in the Management of Limestone Resources in East Asia: Lessons from East Asia", The World Bank, 1999,

External links

 Speleogenesis Network, a communication platform for physical speleology and karst science research
 Speleogenesis and Karst Aquifers – a large glossary of Karst related terms
 Acta Carsologica – research papers and reviews in all the fields related to karst
 CDK Citizens of the Karst – Citizens of the Karst, a non profit NGO dedicated to the protection of the Puerto Rican Karst (English site available)
 The Virtual Cave's page on karst landforms
 Karst Information Portal - an open-access digital library linking scientists, managers, and explorers

 
Landforms
Limestone formations
Geomorphology
Dinaric karst formations
Dinaric Alps